The canton of L'Isle-Adam is an administrative division of the Val-d'Oise department, Île-de-France region, northern France. Its borders were modified at the French canton reorganisation which came into effect in March 2015. Its seat is in L'Isle-Adam.

It consists of the following communes:

Asnières-sur-Oise
Beaumont-sur-Oise
Bernes-sur-Oise
Bruyères-sur-Oise
Champagne-sur-Oise
L'Isle-Adam
Mours
Nerville-la-Forêt
Nointel
Noisy-sur-Oise
Parmain
Persan
Presles
Ronquerolles
Villiers-Adam

References

Cantons of Val-d'Oise